Oriental Radio (オリエンタルラジオ), also known as Ori Raji (オリラジ), is a Japanese comedy duo consisting of Atsuhiko Nakata and Shingo Fujimori under the entertainment agency, Yoshimoto Kogyo.

Atsuhiko and Shingo met while working as part-time operators at a vehicle accident reception desk. While attending university, following Atsuhiko, Shingo followed and joined NSC. In April 2005, they debuted on their first television show, TBS Genseki. They became famous with their Buyūden act in 2006.

Oriental Radio made it into the semi finals at the 2005 M-1 Grand Prix. Their entertainment agency didn't allow them to participate in the consolation match. They entered M-1 Grand Prix again in 2007, making it to the semi finals again but lost. However, they were able to participate in the consolation match this time, but they didn't win to make it to the finals.

Oriental Radio are currently regulars on Waratte Iitomo on Fridays.

They released their first DVD on March 12, 2008.

On December 23, 2015, they released a song "Perfect Human" under the name RADIO FISH. After the performance on the TV program "Engei Grand Slam", it went viral and  peaked at No. 3 on Billboard Japan Hot 100 and No. 1 on Japanese iTunes chart. It also gained 71,291,995 views on YouTube.

Members 
 , born September 27, 1982, in Takatsuki, Osaka
 , born March 17, 1983, in Suwa, Nagano

Filmography

Movies
Heidi (Voice only) - Atsuhiko as goat, Shingo as butler.
The Wild (Voice only)
TAXi4 (Voice only) - Atsuhiko as Daniel
Tamagotchi: The Movie (Voice only) - Atsuhiko as Atchi, Shingo as Shingotchi
Tsugaru 100 nen Shokudo - Atsuhiko as the founder of Ohmori Restaurant, Shingo as the fourth.
Pretty Cure All Stars: Spring Carnival (Voice only) - Atsuhiko as Odoren, Shingo as Utaen
Saber + Zenkaiger: Super Hero Senki (Voice only) - Shingo as Revice Equipment

Television
Kamen Rider Saber (Voice only, Special Issue) - Shingo as Revice Equipment, Vistamps
Kamen Rider Revice (Voice only) - Shingo as Chic, Revice/Live/Evil/Jeanne Equipment, Vistamps

Discography

Singles
STAR (2015)
TONIGHT (2015)
GOOD BYE (2015)
SUMMER TIME (2015)
PARADISE (2015)
PERFECT HUMAN (2015)
WONDERLAND (2016)

Albums
PERFECT HUMAN (2016)

Awards

References

External links
Oriental Radio official Site 
Yoshimoto Kogyo's official profile on Oriental Radio 
Official Blog 
Fujimori Shingo's Blog
Nakata Atsuhiko's Blog

Oriental Radio
Japanese YouTube groups